A location-based game (or location-enabled game, or geolocation-based game) is a type of game in which the gameplay evolves and progresses via a player's location. Location-based games must provide some mechanism to allow the player to report their location, usually with GPS. Many location-based games are video games that run on a mobile phone with GPS capability, known as location-based video games.

"Urban gaming" or "street games" are typically multi-player location-based games played out on city streets and built up urban environments. Various mobile devices can be used to play location-based games; these games have been referred to as "location-based mobile games", merging location-based games and mobile games.

Location-based games may be considered to be pervasive games.

Video Games 

Some location-based games that are video games have used embedded mobile technologies such as near field communication, Bluetooth, and UWB. Poor technology performance in urban areas has led some location-based games to incorporate disconnectivity as a gameplay asset.

Organizations
In 2006, Penn State students founded the Urban Gaming Club. The goal of the club is to provide location-based games and Alternate Reality Games. Some of the games played by Penn State's UGC are Humans vs. Zombies, Manhunt, Freerunning and Capture the Flag.  Students at other American universities have formed similar organizations, such as the Zombie Outbreak Management Facilitation Group at Cornell College.

Learning
Location-based games may induce learning. de Souza e Silva and Delacruz (2006) have observed that these activities produce learning that is social, experiential and situated. Learning however is related to the objectives of the game designers. In a survey of location-based games (Avouris & Yiannoutsou, 2012)  it was observed that in terms of the main objective, these games may be categorized as ludic,(e.g. games that are created for fun), pedagogic, (e.g. games created mainly for learning), and hybrid,(e.g. games with mixed objectives).
The ludic group, are to a large extent action oriented, involving either shooting, action or treasure hunt type of activities. These are weakly related to a narrative and a virtual world. However, the role-playing version of these games seem to have a higher learning potential, although this has yet to be confirmed through more extended empirical studies. On the other hand, the social interaction that takes place and skills related to strategic decisions, observation, planning, physical activity are the main characteristics of this strand in terms of learning. The pedagogic group of games involve participatory simulators, situated language learning and educational action games. Finally the hybrid games are mostly museum location-based games and mobile fiction, or city fiction.

See also
 Alternate reality game
 Encounter (game)
 Entertainment district
 fAR-Play, a location-based game platform
 Geosocial networking
 Location-based service
 Mixed reality game
 mscape, a location-based game platform.
 Pervasive game
 Sentient computing
 Ubiquitous computing

References

External links
 Bullerdiek, Sönke: Design and Evaluation of Pervasive Games, Thesis (de) 2006
 Gamers turn cities into a battleground - article on urban gaming from New Scientist
 Dreher, Thomas: Pervasive Games: Interfaces, Strategies and Moves
 Encyclopedia of Location-Based Games - dasbox.be. List of (mostly) GPS games and short comments. Archived from the original on 2 February 2017. Retrieved 13 September 2019.

Game terminology
Global Positioning System
Location-based games
Geographic position
Pervasive games